A claque is an organized body of professional applauders in French theatres and opera houses. Members of a claque are called claqueurs.

History
Hiring people to applaud dramatic performances was common in classical times. For example, when the Emperor Nero acted, he had his performance greeted by an encomium chanted by five thousand of his soldiers.

This inspired the French poet Jean Daurat (1508-1588) to develop the modern claque. Buying a number of tickets for a performance of one of his plays, he gave them away in return for a promise of applause. In 1820 claques underwent serious systematization when an agency in Paris opened to manage and supply claqueurs.

By 1830 the claque had become an institution. The manager of a theatre or opera house could send an order for any number of claqueurs. This could take several forms. There would be  ("officers/commissioner") who learned the piece by heart and called the attention of their neighbors to its good points between the acts. (laughers) laughed loudly at the jokes. (criers), generally women, feigned tears, by holding their handkerchiefs to their eyes. (ticklers) kept the audience in a good humor, while  (encore-ers) simply clapped and cried "" to request encores.

The practice spread to Italy (famously at La Scala, Milan), Vienna, London (Covent Garden) and New York (the Metropolitan Opera). Claques were also used as a form of extortion, as singers were commonly contacted by the chef de claque before their debut and forced to pay a fee in order to avoid being booed.

Richard Wagner withdrew a staging of his opera  from the Parisian operatic repertory after the claque of the Jockey Club derisively interrupted its initial performances in March 1861.

Later Arturo Toscanini and Gustav Mahler discouraged claques, as a part of the development of concert etiquette.

Although the practice mostly died out during the mid- to late-20th century, instances of actors paid to applaud at performances still occasionally appear, most famously with the Bolshoi Ballet.

See also

 Astroturfing
 Cheerleading
 Kakegoe
 Laugh track
 ōmukou (:ja:大向う) - case of Kabuki
 Payola
 Professional mourning
 Shill
 Social proof

Notes

References

 The Oxford Dictionary of Opera, by John Warrack and Ewan West (1992), 782 pages,  

16th-century establishments in France
Entertainment occupations
Gestures of respect
Opera in France
Opera terminology
Theatre in France